Evan S. Tyler was a politician in the state of North Dakota.

Tyler was born on March 22, 1843 in Damascus, Pennsylvania. Eventually he moved to Owatonna, Minnesota and later to Fargo, North Dakota. He married Clara Estella Barnes. On August 24, 1923 he died in Fargo and was later buried in Delavan, Wisconsin.

Career
Tyler was the Mayor of Fargo from 1876 to 1877, and was a member of the North Dakota House of Representatives in 1889 and from 1895 to 1896. He served in the Union Army during the American Civil War.

References

People from Wayne County, Pennsylvania
Members of the North Dakota House of Representatives
Mayors of Fargo, North Dakota
Union Army soldiers
1843 births
1923 deaths
People from Owatonna, Minnesota
People from Delavan, Wisconsin